Pesante is a musical term, meaning "heavy and ponderous."

References

Musical terminology
Musical notation